Asc-type amino acid transporter 1 (Asc-1) is a protein that in humans is encoded by the SLC7A10 gene.

See also
 Heterodimeric amino acid transporter

References

Further reading

Solute carrier family